Ephraim Israel National Convention is/was a regional political party in the Indian state of Mizoram. The existence of the party is unclear, the only reference found is at. Most probably the party has a similar agenda as the Ephraim Union.

References

Political parties in Mizoram
Zionist organizations
Year of establishment missing